Saraya was an American hard rock band, based in New Jersey and featuring singer Sandi Saraya, guitarist Tony "Bruno" Rey, keyboardist Gregg Munier, bassist Gary Taylor, and drummer Chuck Bonfante. The band is best known for their 1989 song "Love Has Taken Its Toll".

History
In 1987, Sandi Saraya and keyboardist Gregg Munier began performing under the name Alsace Lorraine. They eventually travelled to Los Angeles in search of stardom, changing their name to Saraya, because Sandi was the face of the band.  After a short stint in Los Angeles, the band returned to New Jersey where Saraya and Munier spent the next year writing material for their debut album. Later in 1987, Saraya and Munier were joined by former Danger Danger guitarist Tony "Bruno" Rey, bassist Gary Taylor, and drummer Chuck Bonfante.

Saraya released their self-titled debut on PolyGram Records in 1989. Executives at PolyGram hoped to eventually develop Sandi Saraya into a sex symbol, making her the "Next Bon Jovi". Promoters wanted to establish Saraya as a good rock band and gradually establish Sandi's sex appeal as the band received more exposure.  The debut album saw some success, spending 39 weeks on the Billboard 200, peaking at No. 79. Their first single, "Love Has Taken Its Toll" reached No. 64 on the Billboard 100, on the week of August 12, 1989, and their followup "Back to the Bullet" peaked at No. 63 on the week of December 2. The ballad "Timeless Love", released by future EMI label SBK Records, was actually recorded as a Sandi Saraya solo project and she was accompanied by session musicians, only that it was credited to her true band's name. Still, "Timeless Love" became their third and last single on the Hot 100, staying even lower at No. 85 on the week of January 20, 1990. Produced and penned by Desmond Child, it was Saraya's only song written and recorded for a film, in that case the horror comedy Shocker. Child explained in November 1989 that, pressed to meet a deadline, he got the idea to wrap Sandi Saraya in huge chains so that she could give her all in singing her lines during the "Timeless Love" session, after explaining to her the background of the song, because her previous takes were unemotional and unsuccessful. She later asked to be chained during the overdubs.

After the first album, there were several line-up changes. Barry Dunaway (formerly of Yngwie Malmsteen) replaced Gary Taylor on bass. Munier recorded keyboards and backing vocals on the second album, When the Blackbird Sings, but was unhappy with the direction of the music as it was more guitar driven.  He later left the band and was replaced with guitarist John Roggio.

After break-up
Sandi Saraya (now Sandra "Sandi" Saraya) was briefly married to Brian Wheat of Tesla in the early 90s, but their marriage ended due to touring pressures. She then married actor Brendan Kelly in 1996 and lives in Princeton, New Jersey with her 5 children Peneth, Epith, Mowgly, Scotch, and Drax Kelly.

Gregg Munier died on February 3, 2006, at the age of 44, from complications of pneumonia.  He is survived by his two sons, Shayne and Lucas.

Tony Rey has been the most prolific of all the band members, playing, writing and recording with, as well as producing, many prominent artists in the music industry, from Joan Jett to Enrique Iglesias to Rihanna.

In October 2010, Saraya planned to reunite for the Firefest Music Festival in the UK. Issues between Sandi Saraya and the Firefest Team, however, prevented the band from performing at the festival.

Final members
Sandra "Sandi" Saraya - lead vocals, tambourine (1987-1992)
Tony "Bruno" Rey - lead and rhythm guitar, backing vocals (1987-1992)
Chuck Bonfante - drums, percussion (1987-1992)
Barry Dunaway - bass guitar, backing vocals (1990-1992)
Johnny "John" Roggio - rhythm and lead guitar, keyboards, backing vocals (1991-1992)

Past members
Gregg Munier - keyboards, piano, backing and lead vocals (1987-1991; died 2006)
Gary "Skid" Taylor - bass guitar, backing vocals (1987-1990)

Discography

Albums
Saraya (1989)

   Love Has Taken Its Toll	5:21
   Healing Touch	        4:43
   Get U Ready            	3:11
   Gypsy Child	                4:39
   One Night Away             	4:39
   Alsace Lorraine	        0:50
   Runnin' Out of Time	        4:14
   Back to the Bullet       	3:58
   Fire to Burn   	        4:38
   Saint Christopher's Medal	4:21
   Drop the Bomb	        5:54

When the Blackbird Sings (1991)
 Queen of Sheba	        6:17
 Bring Back the Light	        6:05
 Hitchin' a Ride	        5:44
 When You See Me Again...	4:37
 Tear Down the Wall	        5:27
 Seducer	                6:11
 When the Blackbird Sings...	5:29
 Lion's Den	                4:14
 In the Shade of the Sun	4:44
 White Highway	                5:08
 New World                     3:36

Singles
"Timeless Love", off the Shocker soundtrack (1989)
"Back to the Bullet", rock mix (1989)

References

American hard rock musical groups
American pop rock music groups
Glam metal musical groups from New Jersey
Musical groups established in 1987
Musical groups disestablished in 1992
Polydor Records artists
Rock music groups from New Jersey
SBK Records artists